Koropó (Coropó) is an extinct language of eastern Brazil. It has been variously classified as a Maxakalían or a Purian language.

Classification
Although Silva Neto (2007) had assumed Koropó to be a Purian language, Nikulin (2020) classifies Koropó as Macro-Jê (Maxakalían branch).

Documentation
Koropó is attested by two word lists collected by German explorers in the early 1800s:
Eschwege (2002: 122-127), 127 words collected in 1815
Schott (1822, pp. 48-51), 55 words collected in 1818

Distribution
In the 18th century, Koropó speakers lived with Coroado Puri speakers along the Pomba River in Minas Gerais.

References

Extinct languages of South America
Maxakalían languages
Indigenous languages of Eastern Brazil